Sheikh Azahari bin Sheikh Mahmud (3 September 1928 – 20 April 2002), better known as A.M. Azahari, was a Brunei politician. According to historian Hussaymiya, it is not possible to verify the truth about his 'Brunei birth'. Many people claimed he was born in Labuan, but Azahari strongly denied the claims and said he was born in Brunei Town in a house on the site where the Churchill Memorial Museum (currently Royal Regalia Museum) was later built.

Biography 
Born of mixed Arab-Malay heritage in Labuan, he was educated in Java and later fought against the Dutch. There he met Mohammad Hatta in Java, and was involved in the Battle of Palembang and Battle of Surabaya. He was the leader of the Brunei People's Party which sought to reduce the power of Sultan Omar Ali Saifuddin III to a constitutional monarch during the Brunei revolt in 1962.

Azahari's party won all 16 elected seats in the 33-member legislative council and as a left-leaning politician, Azahari strongly objected to the idea for Brunei's membership in the Federation of Malaysia, along with British North Borneo (which was later renamed to Sabah), Sarawak and Singapore.

The idea of the North Kalimantan was originally proposed by Azahari, who had forged links with Sukarno's nationalist movement, together with Ahmad Zaidi Adruce, in Java in the 1940s. The idea supported and propagated the unification of all Borneo territories under British rule to form an independent leftist North Kalimantan state. 

Azahari personally favoured Brunei's independence and merging with British North Borneo and Sarawak to form the federation with the Sultan of Brunei as the constitutional monarch.

However, the Brunei People’s Party was in favour of joining Malaysia on the condition it was as the unified three territories of northern Borneo with their own Sultan, and hence was strong enough to resist domination by Malaya, Singapore, Malay administrators or Chinese merchants.

The North Kalimantan (or Kalimantan Utara) proposal was seen as a post-decolonisation alternative by local opposition against the Malaysia plan. Local opposition throughout the Borneo territories was primarily based on economic, political, historical and cultural differences between the Borneo states and Malaya, as well as the refusal to be subjected under peninsular political domination.

Prior to the Brunei revolt, which he was involved in planning, Azahari relocated to Manila in order to prevent the risk of being captured by Commonwealth forces after the rebellion occurred. However, the rebellion ultimately failed after Commonwealth forces aided the Bruneian government in rapidly suppressing it.

Life in exile and death
After his defeat, Azahari fled to Jakarta where he was granted asylum by President Sukarno in 1963 and lived in Bogor, West Java. A. M. Azahari later died in 2002 in Bogor, Indonesia. He was 73.

He is survived by a wife and more than 10 children. Azahari was the strong voice against the proposal by then Prime Minister Tunku Abdul Rahman Putra to merge Malaya, Sabah, Sarawak and Brunei to form Malaysia. 

Instead, Azahari, who led BPP from the time it was formed in 1956 to when the party was disbanded in 1962, proposed the formation of a unified state consisting of Brunei, Sarawak and North Borneo.

Footnotes

Further reading 
 World History Study Guide. "Parti Rakyat Brunei History Summary". Retrieved 15 December 2005.
 Sejarah Indonesia "The Sukarno years: 1950 to 1965". Retrieved 15 December 2005.
 US Department of State. "Brunei". Retrieved 17 September 2010.

1928 births
2002 deaths
Bruneian people of Arab descent
Bruneian rebels
Brunei People's Party politicians
Naturalised citizens of Indonesia
Bruneian emigrants to Indonesia